Statistics of Ekstraklasa for the 1962 season.

Overview
It was contested by 14 teams, and Polonia Bytom won the championship.

Regular season

Group A

Results

Group B

Results

Playoff stage

1st place playoff
Górnik Zabrze 1-4 ; 2-2 Polonia Bytom

3rd place playoff
Odra Opole 1-0 ; 0-1 Zagłębie Sosnowiec

5th place playoff
Wisła Kraków 1-1 ; 1-4 Legia Warsaw

7th place playoff
Arkonia Szczecin 2-0 ; 1-2 Ruch Chorzów

9th place playoff
Lechia Gdańsk 2-0 ; 1-3 ŁKS Łódź

11th place playoff
Gwardia Warszawa 2-6 ; 1-2 Lech Poznań

13th place playoff
Stal Mielec 3-0 ; 1-0 KS Cracovia

Top goalscorers

References
Poland – List of final tables at RSSSF 

Ekstraklasa seasons
1
Pol
Pol